The Royal Order of the Crown of Tonga (Tongan: Fakalangilangi 'o Kalauni 'o Tonga) is an Order of Merit awarded for exceptional services to Tonga and the Crown of Tonga.

History 
It was established 16 April 1913 by George Tupou II to reward those who distinguished themselves by exceptional services to the State and the Crown. The Order was in four classes, and the insignia were designed and manufactured in Germany. The first awards were made in August 1914, to the King, Queen ʻAnaseini Takipō and to F T Goedicke, the Chancellor of the Order. Shortly afterwards word arrived of the outbreak of the First World War, and the king suspended further awards for the duration. The Order was forgotten with Tupou's death in 1918.

It was reorganized on 31 July 2008 by King George Tupou V, in particular relatively to all the classes of merit. It can be awarded to militaries and civilians, native of Tonga or foreigner, without distinction of religion.

Classes
The order is presented in four classes:
 Knight Grand Cross with Collar - Collar, Star, Sash, Miniature & Ribbon bar
Knight/Dame Grand Cross - Star, Sash, Miniature & Ribbon bar 
Knight/Dame Commander - Necklet, Miniature & Ribbon bar
Member - Breast Badge, Miniature & Ribbon bar

Insignia 
The Sash for the two upper classes is a red moiré sash with a white stripe near each edge. Men's sash is 102mm wide  (proportions : 2.5/14.5/68/14.5/2.5mm). Women's sash is 75mm wide (proportions : 1.5/10./51/10.5/1.5mm).

Knight Grand Cross 
The Collar is a double gold chain, set with a 6-pointed white enamel gold edged star (centre-piece), with on either side moving upwards; a golden dove in flight,  three gold crossed swords, a 6-pointed white enamel gold edged star. Hanging from it, a white enamel Maltese cross with a narrow gold edge, pendant from a gold Tongan crown. The red central medallion has a raised gold Tongan crown, the red riband has a gold legend in capital letters : KO'E  'OTUA MO TONGA KO HOKU TOFI'A. ("God and Tonga Are My Inheritance").

The Knight Grand Cross' Star / Plaque is a silver, silver-gilt & enamel 8-pointed faceted star with the collar-badge (minus the crown), placed in the centre.

Recipients include:
Australia
 Dame Quentin Bryce (Former Governor-General of Australia)
 General Sir Peter Cosgrove (Former Governor-General of Australia)

Bhutan
 The Princess Ashi Sonam Dechen Wangchuck of Bhutan

Japan
 Empress Kōjun
 Emperor Naruhito

New Zealand
 Tūheitia Potatau Te Wherowhero VII, Māori King

Thailand
 The Princess Sirindhorn of Thailand, The Princess Debaratanarajasuda, The Princess Royal

Tonga
 Halaevalu Mataʻaho, The Late Queen Mother of Tonga
 Prince Sione Ngū Manumataongo, The 5th Prince Fatafehi Tuʻipelehake
 The Princess Salote Mafileʻo Pilolevu Tukuʻaho of Tonga, The Princess Royal, The Lady Tuita of ʻUtungake
 The Late Queen Sālote Tupou III
 The Prince Tupoutoʻa ʻUlukalala, The Crown Prince of Tonga
 The Princess Sinaitakala Fakafanua, The Crown Princess of Tonga
 The Prince Viliami Tukuʻaho, The 15th Prince ʻAta of Tonga

United Kingdom
 Prince Richard, Duke of Gloucester
 Birgitte, Duchess of Gloucester

Grand Cross 
The Grand Cross' Star is a silver 8-pointed faceted star, with the collar-badge (minus the crown), placed in the centre.
 Simon Arthur, 4th Baron Glenarthur

Commander 
The Commander’s Necklet Badge is a white badge with a gold crown worn from the neck on a ribbon,  approx. 41mm wide, red with two white stripes near the edge (approximative proportions 1/5.5/28/5.5/1 mm). Recipients include: 
 Stephen Brady
 Elizabeth Wood-Ellem

Member 
The Member’s Badge is a breast badge (smaller than Commander's) worn from a similar 36mm ribbon (approximative proportions 6/6/12/6/6mm).

References

Orders, decorations, and medals of Tonga
Order of the Crown of Tonga
Awards established in 1913
1913 establishments in Tonga